The following is a list of state forests in Kentucky.

References

See also
 List of U.S. National Forests for National Forests in Kentucky

Kentucky